S.D.I. (Strategic Defense Initiative) is a 1986 action adventure computer game developed and published by Cinemaware. The game is set during the Cold War.

Plot
This game was released near the end of the Cold War. According to the game introduction screen, it takes place in October 2017 (and assumes the Soviet Union had not collapsed). The game uses the controversial Strategic Defense Initiative (S.D.I.) as its plot device.  True to its name, Cinemaware also looked to Hollywood for some inspiration of the storyline.  The storyline is reminiscent of several secret agent movies (such as the 007 films From Russia with Love and Moonraker). The game assumes that both the USSR and the United States have their own version of S.D.I. protecting their respective nations. The American station is never referred to by name. However, the manual and the in-game text indicate that the Soviet facility is called V. I. Lenin Defense Station. It is also mentioned that the Soviet station has laser cannons for defense against fighters.

Gameplay

The player takes the role of the commander-in-chief of the American SDI system, who according to the game manual is a Captain named Sloan McCormick, presumably in the United States Air Force. McCormick has his headquarters in the American space station, which monitors a network of twelve anti-missile satellites in geosynchronous orbit over the United States. The game's advertising blurb indicates that these American satellites employ particle beams. The plot states that Russian revolutionary extremists, led by discontented members of the KGB have gained control of several ICBMs, as well as space launch facilities needed for deploying crewed orbital fighters. Because they have received no response to their demands for the Kremlin to surrender and for the Americans to abandon their SDI system, the revolutionaries have begun using their seized assets to periodically launch fighters against both space stations. They have also begun periodically firing waves of nuclear missiles at the United States. The player engages the enemy projectiles and enemy ships using a space-based fighter. The player must destroy the incoming missiles lest they wreak destruction upon the U.S. The player must also make repairs to the defense satellites that become damaged during the battles.

Later in the game, the player continues the role of McCormick as, in order to finish the game, McCormick must make a desperate attempt to rescue his lover—he does not necessarily have to succeed. She is the Soviet station commander, and according to the manual her name is Natalia "Talia" Kazarian. She is placed in grave danger because her station is eventually boarded by the enemy forces, so McCormack must attempt to fight his way past them and reach Kazarian before she is killed. The manual even goes so far as to say that she is at risk of torture, but this is not shown. "Kazarian" is not an ethnic Russian name. The name is from Armenia, or, in the counterfactual universe of the game where the Soviet Union did not fall in 1991, from the Armenian Soviet Socialist Republic.

Reception
Antic stated that S.D.I. for the Atari ST was "only partially successful". Comparing portions to Star Raiders and Missile Command, the magazine stated that it "is a series of old arcade games strung together [without] depth", criticizing the "fairly repetitious" gameplay and "inconsistent" joystick controls. The reviewer concluded, however, asking "why do I find myself playing it again and again? I don't know, but once I get into it, it holds a bizarre fascination as few other games do. And if that's not a recommendation, I don't know what is". Computer Gaming World praised the ST version, particularly for its touching ending sequences. The review also noted the game "relies more on arcade elements than the other Cinemaware games". Compute! praised the Atari ST version's graphics but called the gameplay repetitive. The Amiga version of the arcade game was reviewed in 1987 in Dragon #128 by Hartley, Patricia, and Kirk Lesser in "The Role of Computers" column. The reviewers gave the game 3 out of 5 stars.

References

External links

1986 video games
Cinemaware games
Amiga games
Atari ST games
DOS games
Classic Mac OS games
Cold War video games
Video games developed in the United States
Video games set in 2017